Neil Lindsey Snowden (born 2 August 1959) is an Australian field hockey player. He competed at the 1984 Summer Olympics in Los Angeles and the 1988 Summer Olympics in Seoul, both where the Australian team placed fourth.

References

External links

1959 births
Living people
Australian male field hockey players
Olympic field hockey players of Australia
Field hockey players at the 1984 Summer Olympics
Field hockey players at the 1988 Summer Olympics